Titmuss is a surname. Notable people with the surname include:
Abi Titmuss (born 1976), English actress, television personality and poker player
Christopher Titmuss (born 1944), British Dharma teacher
Richard Titmuss (1907–1973), British social researcher and teacher
Fred Titmuss, (1898–1966) English footballer